Centrochelys is a genus of tortoise.  It contains one extant species and several extinct species:
 Centrochelys atlantica
 Centrochelys burchardi
 Centrochelys marocana
 Centrochelys robusta
 Centrochelys vulcanica
 Centrochelys sulcata (African spurred tortoise)

The largest species, C. marocana, reached  in carapace length.

The conservation status of Centrochelys sulcata  has been changed from Vulnerable to Threatened with extinction by the International Union for Conservation of Nature because of seasonal wildfires, the international pet trade, and competition for food and space with other domestic animals.

References 

Turtle genera
Reptile genera with one living species
Taxa named by John Edward Gray
Testudinidae